Zhanakala is a district of West Kazakhstan Region in western Kazakhstan. The administrative center of the district is the selo of Zhanakala. Population:

References 

Districts of Kazakhstan
West Kazakhstan Region